Mohammadabad (also Romanized as Moḩammadābād; also known as Moḩammadābād Qadīm) is a village in Dastgerdan Rural District, Dastgerdan District, Tabas County, South Khorasan Province, Iran. At the 2006 census, its population was 48, in 13 families.

References 

Populated places in Tabas County